The James Spear House is a historic home in Charleston, South Carolina along Charleston's Battery. The property upon which the house was built was acquired by James Spear in 1860 for $5,000; a plat connected with the sale does not reveal any improvements to the lot. However, by the time of a municipal census conducted in 1861, Spear was already occupying the house.

The house is a three-story brick house in the Italianate style that was popular in Charleston just before the Civil War. The house has a two-story porch across the front (south facade) with a third story that is open to the elements. Behind the house, there is a two-story service building original to the house. The service building was connected to the house some time after 1882.

References

External links
 James Spear House at Library of Congress

Houses in Charleston, South Carolina